The National Security Law was a Brazilian law that sought to guarantee the national security of the State against the subversion of law and order. It was revoked in 2021 by Law No. 14,197, though its provisions pertaining national security and the defense of the democratic rule of law, including crimes against national sovereignty: attacks on the nation's sovereignty, national integrity and espionage, became part of the Brazilian Penal Code.

History
Since the Empire of Brazil there has been legislation on national security. They have been updated over time and the National Security Law (LSN) or Law No. 7,170 of 14 December 1983, defined crimes against national security, political and social order, also establishing its trial procedure and judgment.

The law became more frequently used in 2020. Attorney General Augusto Aras stated in April 2021 that he would not investigate president Jair Bolsonaro for the use of the National Security Law against critics and opponents, understanding that he would not be responsible for the actions of junior officials.

The Chamber of Deputies approved a bill repealing the law in May 2021, also including new "crimes against democracy", such as a coup d'état and interruption of elections, in the Penal Code. In July, the project was approved by the Federal Senate, and was sanctioned in September 2021, with vetoes, by the President of the Republic.

Crimes against national security
The law provided, in the Brazilian legal system, for crimes that harm national security or expose it to danger of injury:
Against territorial integrity and national sovereignty, acts of trying to dismember part of the national territory to constitute an independent country incur a crime with a penalty of imprisonment from 4 to 12 years;
Enticing individuals from another country to invade national territory, whose penalty is imprisonment for 3 to 10 years and if the invasion occurs, the penalty is increased up to double;
the person of the heads of the Powers of the Union, legislative, executive and judiciary.

See also
Ministry of Defence

References

1983 establishments in Brazil
Law of Brazil